Humberto Alonso Morelli (born 26 November 1971) is a Mexican politician affiliated with the PAN. He currently serves as Deputy of the LXII Legislature of the Mexican Congress representing Veracruz.

References

1971 births
Living people
People from Veracruz (city)
Members of the Chamber of Deputies (Mexico) for Veracruz
National Action Party (Mexico) politicians
Politicians from Veracruz
21st-century Mexican politicians
Monterrey Institute of Technology and Higher Education alumni
Deputies of the LXII Legislature of Mexico